Gadchinchale is a village in the Palghar district of Maharashtra, India. It is located in the Dahanu taluka.

Demographics 

According to the 2011 census of India, Gadchinchale has 248 households. The effective literacy rate (i.e. the literacy rate of population excluding children aged 6 and below) is 30.42%.

See also
 2020 Palghar mob lynching

References 

Villages in Dahanu taluka